Christhu Raj College is an arts and science college founded in 1998. The college campus is located in Tiruchirappalli, India and is affiliated to Bharathidasan University.

References 

Universities and colleges in Tiruchirappalli
Colleges affiliated to Bharathidasan University